Robot Wants Kitty is a 2011 action-adventure platform game developed by American indie developer Hamumu Software. It was adapted from an earlier Flash game of the same name.

Plot

The player character is a robot who must navigate a maze to rescue a kitten.

Gameplay
The player controls the robot as it navigates a series of six mazes, the goal in each being to reach the eponymous kitten. At the beginning of each level, the robot can do nothing but run left and right, but it will acquire additional abilities by obtaining items (called "apps") hidden throughout the maze, thus allowing it to backtrack and traverse previously impassable obstacles. Once the robot reaches the kitten, the robot is stripped of all of its apps and sent to the next level, where the process begins again.

There is also a timer. The player loses twenty seconds each time the robot is destroyed and respawns on the last checkpoint, gains one second for each enemy destroyed, and gains ten seconds for collecting a timesaver app.

Reception

Robot Wants Kitty received positive reviews, currently sitting at 82/100 on Metacritic. TouchArcade gave it 4 stars out of 5, saying, "The way you acquire all of these abilities fits perfectly in to the Metroidvania formula ... it feel[s] like the essence of what makes said formula work so well has been practically perfectly distilled", though also added, "I suppose you could look at the fact that there's only six levels as a negative point of the game". Eurogamer scored the game 8/10, calling it "as charming as they come", and writing that during the game, "comparisons to some of the genre's true greats spring to mind".

References

External links

Robot Wants Kitty at GameFAQs

2011 video games
Action-adventure games
IOS games
IOS-only games
Metroidvania games
Platform games
Video games about cats
Video games about robots
Video games developed in the United States